Arıkan is a Turkish surname. Notable people with the surname include:

 Burak Arıkan (born 1976), Turkish artist
 Erdal Arıkan (born 1958), Turkish electrical engineer
 Hakan Arıkan (born 1982), Turkish footballer
 Jale Arıkan (born 1965), Turkish-German actress
 Kemal Arıkan (1927–1982), Turkish diplomat assassinated in the U.S. by an Armenian group
 Meltem Arıkan (born 1968), Turkish novelist and playwright
Okyanus Arıkan (born 2004), Turkish yacht racer
Vural Arıkan (1929–1993), Turkish economist, lawyer and politician

Turkish-language surnames